Yoshio is both a masculine Japanese given name and a Japanese surname.

Possible writings
Yoshio can be written using many different combinations of kanji characters. Here are some examples:

義雄, "justice, masculine"
義男, "justice, man"
義夫, "justice, husband"
吉雄, "good luck, masculine"
吉男, "good luck, man"
吉夫, "good luck, husband"
善雄, "virtuous, masculine"
善男, "virtuous, man"
善夫, "virtuous, husband"
芳雄, "fragrant/virtuous, masculine"
芳男, "fragrant/virtuous, man"
芳夫, "fragrant/virtuous, husband"
喜雄, "rejoice, masculine"
喜男, "rejoice, noble"
喜夫, "rejoice, husband"
慶雄, "congratulate, masculine"
佳夫, "fine, husband"
嘉男, "excellent, man"
余四男, "too much, 4, man"
誉士夫, "reputation, knight, husband"

The name can also be written in hiragana よしお or katakana ヨシオ.

Notable people with the name

, Japanese zoologist
Yoshio Anabuki (穴吹 義雄, 1933–2018), Japanese former baseball player and former manager of the Nankai Hawks
Yoshio Fujiwara, (藤原 良夫, Birth and death unknown) former Japanese football player
Yoshio Fukuyama (福山 喜雄, 1921–1995), theologian who holds a doctorate in sociology from the University of Chicago
Yoshio Furukawa (古川 好男, born 1934), former Japanese football player
Yoshio Hachiro (鉢呂 吉雄, born 1948), Japanese politician of the Democratic Party of Japan (DPJ)
Yoshio Harada (原田 芳雄, 1940–2011), Japanese actor
, Japanese ice hockey player
, Japanese triple jumper
Yoshio Inaba (稲葉 義男, 1920–1998), Japanese actor who played Gorobei in Akira Kurosawa's Seven Samurai
Yoshio Ishida (石田 芳夫, born 1948), professional Go player
Yoshio Kato (加藤 好男, born 1957), former Japanese football player
Yoshio Kawai (河合 義雄, born 1954), Japanese voice actor
Yoshio Kikugawa (菊川 凱夫, born 1944), former Japanese football player
Yoshio Kimura (木村 義雄, born 1948), Japanese politician of the Liberal Democratic Party
Yoshio Kimura (shogi) (木村 義雄, 1905–1986), Japanese shogi player
Yoshio Kitagawa (北川 佳男, born 1978), former Japanese football player
Yoshio Kitajima (北島 義生, born 1975), Japanese football player
Yoshio Kodaira (小平 義雄, 1905–1949), Japanese rapist and serial killer
Yoshio Kodama (児玉 誉士夫, 1911–1984), prominent figure in the rise of organized crime in Japan
, Japanese footballer
Yoshio Kojima (小島 義雄, born 1980), Japanese comedian famous for appearing in only a small bathing suit
Yoshio Kushida (串田 嘉男, born 1957), Japanese astronomer
Yoshio Machida (町田 良夫, born 1967), experimental musician, a steelpanist, composer, and visual artist
Yoshio Maki (牧 義夫, born 1958), Japanese politician of the Democratic Party of Japan
Yoshio Makino (牧野 義雄, 1869–1956), Japanese artist and author who spent much of his life in London
Yoshio Masui (増井 禎夫, born 1931), Japanese cell biologist
Yoshio Mikami (三上 義夫, 1875–1950), Japanese mathematician and wasan historian
Yoshio Miki (三木 義雄, 1905–????), Japanese hurdler
, Japanese rower
Yoshio Mochizuki (望月 義夫, 1947–2019), Japanese politician of the Liberal Democratic Party
, Japanese racewalker
Yoshio Muto, Japanese diplomat who served as Imperial Japan's consul general in the United States in 1941
Yoshio Nakagawa (中川 義雄, born 1938), Japanese politician of the Liberal Democratic Party
, Japanese judoka
Yoshio Nishi (西 義郎, 1934–2019), Japanese scholar of Tibeto-Burman linguistics
Yoshio Nishina (仁科 芳雄, 1890–1951), the founding father of modern physics research in Japan
, Japanese idol, musician and actor
 Yoshio Oishi (大石 良雄, 1659–1703), the chamberlain of the Akō han in Harima Province, Japan (1679–1701)
Yoshio Okada (岡田 吉夫, 1926–2002), former Japanese football player
Yoshio Sakai (酒井 義雄, 1910–?), Japanese field hockey player
Yoshio Sakamoto (坂本 賀勇, born 1959), Japanese game designer working for Nintendo
Yoshio Sakurauchi (櫻内 義雄, 1912–2003), Japanese politician
Yoshio Sawai (澤井 啓夫, born 1977), Japanese gag manga creator
, Japanese cyclist
Yoshio Shinozuka (篠塚 良雄, 1923–2014), former Imperial Army soldier who served with a top secret Japanese biological warfare group in World War II
Yoshio Shirai (白井 義男, 1923–2003), professional boxer from Tokyo, Japan
, Japanese sociologist
Yoshio Tabata (田端 義夫, 1919–2013), Japanese ryūkōka and enka singer, songwriter and electric guitarist
Yoshio Tachibana (立花 芳夫, 1890–1946), lieutenant general of the Japanese Imperial Army
Yoshio Taniguchi (谷口 吉生, born 1937), Japanese architect who redesigned the Museum of Modern Art in New York
Yoshio Tarui (樽井 芳雄, 1902–1977), Japanese photographer
Yoshio Tezuka (手塚 仁雄, born 1966), Japanese politician
Yoshio Tsuchiya (土屋 嘉男, 1927–2017), Japanese actor who has appeared in several films
Yoshio Ueki (植木 善大, born 1969), professional Go player
Yoshio Urushibara (漆原 良夫, born 1944), Japanese politician of the New Komeito Party
Yoshio Utsumi (内海 善雄, born 1942), the secretary-general of the International Telecommunication Union 1998–2006
Yoshio Watanabe (渡辺 義雄, 1907–2000), renowned Japanese photographer
Yoshio Yamada (山田 孝雄||1873–1958), Japanese linguist
Yoshio Yatsu (谷津 義男, 1934–2021), Japanese politician of the Liberal Democratic Party
Yoshio Yoda (ヨシオ・ジェームス・ヨダ, born 1934), Japanese-American actor who played Fuji Kobiaji on the television series McHale's Navy
Yoshio Yoshida (吉田 義男, born 1933), Japanese baseball player and manager
Yoshio Yoshida (吉田 好雄, 1921 – before 2000), Japanese World War II flying ace

Notable people with the surname Yoshio
Kosaku Yoshio (吉雄 耕牛, 1724–1800), Japanese scholar of "Dutch studies", and the chief Dutch translator in Nagasaki
, Japanese sprint canoeist

Fictional characters
Yoshio Saotome (早乙女 好雄), from Tokimeki Memorial

Japanese-language surnames
Japanese masculine given names